Lal Qila is another name for the Red Fort in Delhi, India. It may also refer to:
 Lal Quila (1960 film), a 1960 Indian film by Nanabhai Bhatt
Lal Qila metro station of the Delhi Metro system
 Lal qila, dir lower, a town in Khyber Pakhtunkhwa, Pakistan
Lal Qilla Tehsil, tehsil in Khyber Pakhtunkhwa, Pakistan
 Qila Rai Pithora, a different fortified complex from the Red Fort, also in Delhi

See also 

 Exercise Lal Qila, a military exercise conducted by the Indian Army 
 Lal Quila Express, a train of the Indian Railways